Charles Edward may refer to:

Charles Edward (horse), a racehorse
Charles Edward Stuart, aka Bonnie Prince Charlie
Charles Edward Stuart, American politician
Charles Edward, Duke of Saxe-Coburg and Gotha
Charles Edward Callwell, British soldier
Charles Edward Flower, British brewer responsible for the creation of the Shakespeare Memorial Theatre
Charles Edward Jennings, Irish soldier
Charles Edward Magoon, American lawyer
Charles Edward Merriam, American professor
Charles Edward Russell, American journalist

See also
Charles Edwards (disambiguation)
Edward Charles